Wang Zhao may refer to:
 Wang Zhao (politician)
 Wang Zhao (linguist)